Pietari Päivärinta (18 September 1827 in Ylivieska – 26 July 1913) was a Finnish writer and Diet member. His depictions of peasant life, quickly translated and published in Germany and Scandinavia, are among the first examples of modern Finnish literature.

He was born in Ylivieska, the eldest son of day labourers. His parents' ill health often obliged him to beg for the family's food. On his marriage to Liisa Tuomikoski he bought a small farm, but was at first unable to make it pay and began a career as an itinerant singer. In 1856 he obtained a post as an assistant clerk, and slowly furthered his career in the administration before entering politics. After his first wife's death he married Anna-Liisa Koskela.

He began writing for newspapers in 1858. His autobiography, My Life, dates from 1877, and was written to pass the time during forced bedrest after breaking his leg. He participated in the Diets of 1882, 1885, 1888 and 1891, and the Synod in 1876, 1886 and 1893.

Works

 Parannuksen harjoitus 1866
 Seurakunnan kosto 1867 
 Elämäni 1877
 Elämän havainnoita I–X 1880–1889
 Naimisen juoruja 1882
 Tintta-Jaakko 1883
 Torpan poika 1883
 Kylään tullessa 1884
 Minä ja muut. Sakeus Pyöriän kertomuksia 1885
 Neuvoja keuhkopoltteen tuntemiseen ja parantamiseen 1885
 Käytännön neuvoja soitten ja rämeitten viljelemiseen 1886
 Isäin pahat teot lasten päällä 1887
 Jälkipoimintoja I–III 1889
 Volmari 1889
 Omistaan eläjiä 1889
 Kanttilaiset 1889
 Oukkari 1889
 Pikakuvia 1867 katovuodesta ja sen seurauksista 1893
 Valitut teokset I–III 1895 
 Syyslehtiä 1900
 Pikku Mari 1903
 Muistelmia kansallistaistelujen alkuajoilta 1903
 Pikku kuvia elämästä 1904
 Siveellisyyskysymys Pohjanmaalla 1904
 Ulpukkalahti y.m. kertomuksia 1910

References

Bibliography
 Ilmari Havu. Pietari Päivärinta. Porvoo, 1921.
 Finland: the country, its people and institutions. Otava, 1926. Page 560.
 Edna Worthley Underwood. Famous Stories from Foreign Countries. Four Seas Company, Boston, 1921. Page 134.

External links
 Pietari Päivärinta Society 
 
  

1827 births
1913 deaths
People from Ylivieska
People from Oulu Province (Grand Duchy of Finland)
Finnish Party politicians
Members of the Diet of Finland
Writers from Northern Ostrobothnia
Finnish writers
Finnish-language writers